Charles Croft (26 November 1918 – 2006) was an English professional footballer who played in the Football League for Mansfield Town.

References

1918 births
2006 deaths
English footballers
Association football midfielders
English Football League players
Huddersfield Town A.F.C. players
Mansfield Town F.C. players
Boston United F.C. players